"Jenifer" is the fourth episode of the first season of Masters of Horror. It originally aired in North America on November 18, 2005. It was directed by Dario Argento and written by and starring Steven Weber. "Jenifer" is loosely adapted from a 10-page black-and-white comic book story, written by Bruce Jones and illustrated by Berni Wrightson, that originally appeared in issue #63 (July 1974) of the horror anthology title Creepy.

Plot
Police officer Frank Spivey (Steven Weber) is eating lunch in his squad car when he happens upon a crazed man with a meat cleaver forcing a young woman (Carrie Fleming) onto the ground. When Spivey intervenes, the man tells Spivey that he "doesn't know what she is," forcing Spivey to shoot the man before he kills her. As he begins to console her, he first notices that although she has an attractive body, her face is horrifically disfigured. Despite his initial revulsion, when she cuddles into his arms, he finds himself affectionately drawn to her.

At the police station, his partner continues to joke about the whole situation, trying to get him to forget about the shooting and the woman. Still oddly drawn to her, Spivey excuses himself from his partner. That night at home, his wife Ruby (Brenda James) attempts to console him after learning of the shooting. As they begin to make love, he keeps picturing the woman and attempts to anally rape his wife, losing himself in his fantasy of the woman before his wife eventually forces him off her.

The next day, after a female detective interrogates the mystery woman, the detective tells Spivey that the girl's name is probably Jenifer, since it was on a note in the man's pocket, and that she's not talking and possibly intellectually disabled. Spivey visits Jenifer at the mental hospital to check on her. A male orderly comments that she has been frightening the male staff. When Frank enters her room, she is still in the shower and runs to embrace him despite being completely nude. Frank takes her to his home because he cannot find anywhere else that will take her. That night he dreams of a non-disfigured Jenifer seducing him. When he awakes, he finds her standing in the room. Frank's wife and his son Pete (Harris Allen) react to meeting her with varying degrees of disgust.

Frank's wife issues an ultimatum that either Jenifer be made to leave or she will, so he goes out to search for somewhere for her to stay once more. This time, instead of looking, he is seduced by Jenifer in his car. When he brings her home, she frightens away Frank's wife and son, devours his cat, and murders and eats his young neighbor Amy (Jasmine Chan). Frank finally attempts to get a carny to kidnap her and put her in his freak show. When Frank arrives home, he finds Jenifer covered in blood and the carny's dead body in his refrigerator. Frank takes Jenifer and flees to an abandoned cabin in the woods, where he hopes he will hide her and she will not hurt anyone else because of it. Frank gets a job at a small market, and Jenifer's hold over him begins to lessen.

One day, Jenifer sees Frank with the attractive owner of the store. She follows the shop owner's teenage son to a party, lures him into the woods, and chokes him into unconsciousness. While looking for Jenifer in the cabin cellar, Frank discovers her devouring the boy's genitals and snaps. Frank ties Jenifer's wrists together with rope and drags her through the woods to kill her. Just as he's about to strike her down, a deer hunter shoots and kills Frank. The hunter moves to comfort Jenifer, and the cycle begins anew.

Cast
 Steven Weber as Frank Spivey, a police detective whose life is destroyed when he succumbs to Jenifer
 Carrie Anne Fleming as Jenifer, a siren-like woman who can entrance men despite her hideous appearance
 Brenda James as Ruby, Frank's wife, who is disgusted by Jenifer
 Harris Allan as Pete, Frank's son
 Beau Starr as Chief Charlie
 Laurie Brunetti as Spacey
 Cynthia Garris as Rose
 Jeffrey Ballard as the young Jack (credited as Jeff Ballard)

Production
This episode was shot in and around Vancouver, British Columbia, Canada. The gore and make-up effects were done by KNB Effects and were received mostly positively by critics and fans. The DVD featurette "Howard Berger and the Make-Up of Jenifer" detailed the process Carrie-Anne Fleming went through to transform her into the beast.

This was the only episode of the first season to require cuts, though Takashi Miike's "Imprint" was entirely rejected for TV. Two shots were removed from the final film, both involving graphic depictions of oral sex: the first one occurred during the sex scene in the car between Frank and Jenifer; the second occurred at the end of the film and actually showed Jenifer castrating—and then eating—young Jack's penis. The deleted scenes are featured in the "So Hideous My Love'" documentary on the DVD.

Reception

Jenifer was released to mixed reviews on its value as a film. Favorable reviews focused in on Argento's ability to mix eroticism and repulsion with the sensual treatment of the sex scenes, often comparing it to his other films such as his version of the Phantom of the Opera and Sleepless.

DVD information
Anchor Bay Entertainment released all the Masters of Horror DVDs with massive extra features for each episode. Their treatment of the DVDs were extremely well received, winning a Saturn Award for "Best Television Series Release on DVD" in 2006. The extra features for Jenifer's DVD release include:

Commentary by writer/actor Steven Weber and DVD producer Perry Martin
So Hideous My Love – An Interview with Dario Argento featurette
Working With a Master: Dario Argento featurette
Behind The Scenes: The Making of Jenifer featurette
Howard Berger and The Make-Up of Jenifer featurette
On Set: An Interview with Steven Weber
On Set: An Interview with Carrie Anne Fleming
Trailers
Still gallery
Dario Argento text bio
Screenplay (DVD-ROM)
Screen saver (DVD-ROM)
Collectible trading card

As with most of the first season of Masters of Horror, Best Buy had an exclusive release which included a featurette called "Script to Screen".

It was originally packaged separately, but later releases packaged it with "Haeckel's Tale" and then the entire first season. Each DVD release has contained all the features the initial release did.

See also
Eel Girl
Harpya
Shambleau
Tomie

References

External links

Masters of Horror episodes
Television shows based on comics
2005 American television episodes
Films directed by Dario Argento